Leverton Pierre (born 9 March 1998) is a Haitian professional footballer who plays as a midfielder for French club USL Dunkerque.

Club career
Pierre signed his first professional contract with SC Bastia on 29 July 2017, joining from the Haitian club CS Saint-Louis. He made his professional debut with AC Ajaccio in a 2–0 loss to Valenciennes FC on 16 February 2018.

International career
Pierre was part of the Haiti national under-20 football team that won the 2017 CONCACAF U-20 Championship qualifying tournament, scoring one goal in the process. In May 2019, he was named to Haiti's 40-man provisional squad for the 2019 CONCACAF Gold Cup. He debuted with the senior Haiti national team in a 1–0 2022 FIFA World Cup qualification loss to Canada on 12 June 2021.

Honors
Haiti U20
 CFU U-20 Tournament: 2016
 2017 CONCACAF U-20 Championship qualifying

References

External links
 
 
 

1997 births
Living people
People from Ouest (department)
Association football forwards
Haitian footballers
Haiti international footballers
Haiti youth international footballers
AC Ajaccio players
FC Metz players
USL Dunkerque players
Ligue 2 players
Championnat National players
Haitian expatriate footballers
Haitian expatriate sportspeople in France
Expatriate footballers in France